In Your House 4 (retroactively titled In Your House 4: Great White North) was the fourth In Your House professional wrestling pay-per-view (PPV) event produced by the World Wrestling Federation (WWF, now WWE). The event took place on October 22, 1995, at the Winnipeg Arena in Winnipeg, Manitoba, Canada. It was the first WWF pay-per-view to take place in Canada since WrestleMania VI in 1990.

Seven professional wrestling matches were featured on the PPV portion of the show and four additional matches were held as dark matches. The main event of the show featured WWF World Heavyweight Champion Diesel defending the championship against The British Bulldog. The show was supposed to feature Shawn Michaels defending the WWF Intercontinental Championship against Dean Douglas but Michaels was physically not able to compete on the show and had to forfeit the championship. In its place Douglas defended, and lost the Intercontinental Championship against Razor Ramon. With the launch of the WWE Network in 2014, this show became available on demand, but does not include the dark matches held before and after the main show.

Production

Background
In Your House was a series of monthly pay-per-view (PPV) shows first produced by the World Wrestling Federation (WWF, now WWE) in May 1995. They aired when the promotion was not holding one of its then-five major PPVs (WrestleMania, King of the Ring, SummerSlam, Survivor Series, and Royal Rumble), and were sold at a lower cost. This fourth In Your House event took place at the Winnipeg Arena in Winnipeg, Manitoba, Canada. While this event was originally known simply as In Your House 4, it was later retroactively renamed as In Your House 4: Great White North. This retroactive renaming of the show was based on the event being held in Canada.

Storylines
The professional wrestling matches at In Your House 4 featured professional wrestlers performing as characters in scripted events pre-determined by the hosting promotion, World Wrestling Federation (WWF). Storylines between the characters played out on WWF's primary television program, Monday Night Raw.

On August 21, 1995 WWF World Heavyweight Champion Diesel teamed up with Davey Boy Smith to take on the team known as Men on a Mission (King Mabel and Sir Mo) in the main event of the WWF's Monday Night Raw show. Up until that day Davey Boy Smith had always been a face in the WWF, but turned on Diesel that night, attacking him and then leaving him alone to fight off King Mabel and Sir Mo. The storyline was picked up against at In Your House 3 when The British Bulldog (Smith was billed exclusively as the British Bulldog by then) teamed up with Yokozuna to take on Diesel and Shawn Michaels in the main event. On September 25 the British Bulldog lost a match to the Undertaker by disqualification as he kept attacking his opponent, which led to Diesel running to the ring to chase the British Bulldog off. Two weeks later the Bulldog pinned Diesel during a six-man tag team match, earning a title match in the process. In the weeks leading up to In Your House 4 the WWF Intercontinental Champion Shawn Michaels had been targeted by the heel Dean Douglas, who claimed to be both intellectually and physically superior to Michaels. In the days before the In Your House show Shawn Michaels was beaten up by a single Marine outside of a bar, which meant that he was unable to compete at the In Your House show against Dean Douglas.

Event
In the third match of the night the reigning WWF Tag Team Champions The Smoking Gunns (Billy Gunn and Bart Gunn) successfully defended the championship against the team of The 1-2-3 Kid and Razor Ramon when the Kid and Ramon were not able to work together as a cohesive unit. Following the match the 1-2-3 Kid turned on his partner, finally taking the next step in the storyline between the two. The fourth match of the night was the debut of Goldust (Dustin Rhodes) in the WWF and the first time the audience saw the character live and not via pre-taped segments. On this night, Goldust defeated Marty Jannetty. The sixth match was supposed to feature Shawn Michaels defending the Intercontinental championship against Dean Douglas, but when Michaels was unable to compete, Douglas was awarded the championship by forfeit. Gorilla Monsoon the then interim WWF President announced that while he won the championship without a match he would have to defend the championship in a surprise match against Razor Ramon. Playing up the storyline that Dean Douglas was not prepared for Razor Ramon, Ramon defeated Douglas to win the championship, making Douglas the shortest reigning Intercontinental champion, with his reign only lasting the length of the match. Bret Hart joined the commentary team for the main event between Diesel and the British Bulldog to push the fact that Bret Hart was next in line for the championship. In the end Bret Hart ended up hitting the British Bulldog, causing the champion to be disqualified, losing the match but not the title. Afterwards Diesel attacked Bret in retaliation for costing Diesel the match.

Reception
Apart from Vince McMahon expressing his anger at the main event, the event was ranked 10th by YouTube wrestling channel Cultaholic in their 2021 list of 10 Worst WWE PPVs ever.

Aftermath
Bret Hart ended up defeating Diesel to win the WWF World Heavyweight Championship a month later in the main event of the 1995 Survivor Series. The title loss led to Diesel's character gaining more of an edge and attitude, teasing his eventual heel turn. After his disqualification victory over Diesel the British Bulldog got the first title match against the new champion, losing to Bret Hart at In Your House 5. After his brief run with the Intercontinental championship Dean Douglas was moved out of the championship picture, relegating him to mid-card storylines before he left the WWF by the end of 1995. The night after the event was the Debut of Ninja Ranger  Avatar.

The Diesel vs British Bulldog main event was very poorly received, it also angered Vince McMahon (who was doing commentary) to the point that he reportedly threw his headset off after the match and the pay-per-view had finished and yelled "horrible, fucking horrible!" at Diesel in the ring and stormed to the back and launched a verbal tirade at producer Bruce Prichard. Bulldog as soon as he got backstage after the match immediately apologised to agents and producers for how bad the match was. Years later Kevin Nash said that this was a sign his time in the company was coming to an end.

Results

Other on-screen personnel

See also

Professional wrestling in Canada

References

04
Events in Manitoba
1995 in Manitoba
Professional wrestling in Manitoba
1995 WWF pay-per-view events
October 1995 events in Canada
WWE in Canada